Partial general elections were held in the southern part of the Faroe Islands on 28 February 1916. The Union Party remained the largest in the Løgting, with 10 of the 20 seats.

Results

References

Elections in the Faroe Islands
Faroe Islands
1916 in the Faroe Islands
February 1916 events
Election and referendum articles with incomplete results